Odd Bonde Nielsen (11 September 1898 – 26 February 1974) was a Norwegian sport shooter. He was born in Oslo. He competed at the 1948 Summer Olympics in London, where he placed 16th in the 25 metre rapid fire pistol.

References

External links

1898 births
1974 deaths
Sportspeople from Oslo
Norwegian male sport shooters
Olympic shooters of Norway
Shooters at the 1948 Summer Olympics